Eucalyptus elata, commonly known as the river peppermint or river white gum, is a species of medium to tall tree that is endemic to eastern Australia. It has rough, compacted bark on the lower trunk, smooth bark above, lance-shaped to curved adult leaves, green to yellow flower buds arranged in groups of eleven to thirty or more, white flowers and hemispherical or shortened spherical fruit.

Description
It has rough, compact, dark grey bark, with narrow longitudinal fissures on the lower trunk. The bark on the upper trunk and branches is smooth, shedding in long ribbons often remaining in the crown, leaving a grey, cream-coloured or whitish surface. Flowering occurs from August to December and the flowers are white.

Taxonomy and naming
Eucalyptus elata was first described in 1829 by Friedrich Dehnhardt in his book, Catalogus Plantarum Horti Camaldulensis. The specific epithet (elata) is a Latin word meaning "exalted", "high" or "lofty".

Distribution and habitat
River peppermint usually grows along watercourse but sometimes also in undulating country, on rocky ridges or on scree slopes in forest. It grows near the coast and nearby tablelands south from Putty in New South Wales to eastern Victoria.

Uses

Use in horticulture
E. elata is widely cultivated as a street and ornamental tree for its beautiful upper smooth bark, rich green foliage and profusion of flowers that appear in spherical masses.

Essential oils
The leaves of E. elata have been distilled commercially for a piperitone based essential oil.

References

elata
Myrtales of Australia
Trees of Australia
Flora of Victoria (Australia)
Flora of New South Wales
Flora of the Australian Capital Territory
Plants described in 1829